Fîntînița is a commune in Drochia District, Moldova. It is composed of two villages, Fîntîniţa (formerly Ghizdita) and Ghizdita, loc. st.c.f. (Ghizdita station). At the 2004 census, the commune had 1,405 inhabitants.

References

Communes of Drochia District